Paracotalpa ursina is a species of shining leaf chafer in the family of beetles known as Scarabaeidae.

Subspecies
These four subspecies belong to the species Paracotalpa ursina:
 Paracotalpa ursina piceola Saylor, 1940 c g
 Paracotalpa ursina rotunda b
 Paracotalpa ursina rubripennis b
 Paracotalpa ursina ursina g b
Data sources: i = ITIS, c = Catalogue of Life, g = GBIF, b = Bugguide.net

References

Further reading

 
 

Rutelinae
Articles created by Qbugbot
Beetles described in 1867